Lawrence Malcolm Allison (1894–1974) was an American maker of gliders and was a pioneer aviator.

References

1894 births
1974 deaths
Members of the Early Birds of Aviation
American aviators